Gérard Le Gouic (born 11 June 1936, in Rédené) is a French poet and writer.

Biography 
Gérard Le Gouic was baptized in September 1936 in the church of Rédené (Finistère). His parents resided in the 14th arrondissement of Paris. He lived there until his departure for Africa. He met the poet Maurice Fombeure, then professor at the Collège Lavoisier in Paris. He spent his childhood holiday in Brittany, home of his parents.

During his military service in Algeria, he became friends with poet  and painter Jacques Rouquier.

From 1959 to 1969, he lived in Africa. His activities in trade will lead him to Fort Lamy in Chad (where he met Henri Queffélec and with whom he became friends) to Pointe-Noire in Congo at Douala in Cameroon and Bangui, Central African Republic. He regularly returned to spend his holidays in Brittany.

On his return to Brittany in 1969, he occupied himself for thirty years with a souvenir shop in Quimper. The sign he chose, "Telen Arvor" ("Harp of Armor") is the title of a collection of the poet Auguste Brizeux and will also be the name he will choose for his own publishing house.

Distinctions 
 Prix de poésie de l'Académie de Bretagne et des Pays de la Loire in 2008
 Prix Antonin-Artaud in 1980 for Géographie du fleuve (Telen Arvor)
 Prix Alfred de Musset of the Société des gens de lettres in 1977 for Poème de l'île et du sel
 Prix Breizh in 1973 for Poèmes de mon vivant

Publications

Poetry 
2015: Pâques, éditions La Porte
2014: Comment allez-vous, éditions La Porte
2012: Une heure chaque jour, éditions Écrits des Forges
2011: Les haïkus du carnet, éditions Telen Arvor
2011: Des arbres, des oiseaux, du ciel, éditions Sac à mots
2010: Pense Bêtes..., éditions Tugdual, Cancale, livre d'artiste, illustration by 
2010: Célébration des larmes, éditions Telen Arvor
2007: Tout amour est dernier amour, éditions Coop Breizh
2006: La belle lumière, éditions Telen Arvor
2006: Nous, une, éditions La Part Commune
2004: Contes et fables du moulin des chiens, éditions Telen Arvor
2001: Attrape-moi aussi un poète, éditions Coop Breizh, for children
2001: Hasards de mer - Autres incertitudes, Le Temps des Cerises
1999: Cafés et autres lieux d'amour, éditions Telen Arvor
1996: Les sentiments obscurs, éd. Coop Breizh
1996: Le Marcheur de rêve, coédition  - Le Dé Bleu
1995: Oiseaux, éditions Les Dits du Pont
1992: Trois poèmes pour trois âges de l'eau, éditions Telen Arvor
1991: Cadastre intime du pommier, éditions du Dossen
1985: Les bateaux en bouteille, éditions Telen Arvor
1983: Le Marais et les jours, éditions Telen Arvor
1982: Feuillus océans, éditions du P.A.V.E
1981: Fermé pour cause de poésie, éditions Picollec, réédition Écrits des Forges
1980: Autoportrait en noir et bleu II,  
1979: Géographie du fleuve, éditions Telen Arvor
1977:Poème de l'île et du sel, éditions Telen Arvor. Translated into:
 English Song of salt and island, by Stanley J. Collier, Éditions du Liogan
 German Insel und salz gedicht, by Fritz Werf, Atelier Verlag Andernach
1977: Autoportrait en noir et bleu, Rougerie
1975: L'Ossuaire de sable, éditions Telen Arvor
1973: Poèmes de mon vivant, selfedition, Prix Bretagne 1973
1971: De mon vivant, Caractères
1968: L'Âge de l'avenir, 
1966:Les Bruits anciens, Chambelland
1961: Dieu-le-douze, Grassin
1960: À la fonte des blés, Grassin
1958: Que la mer vienne, José Millias-Martin

Novels, narratives, short stories, diaries 
2016: Le pont suspendu, dans l'anthologie Longères, bombardes et ressacs, Stéphane Batigne Éditeur
2014: Les Pays chauds, éditions des Montagnes Noires
2014: Le Voyage de Clara, éditions des Montagnes Noires
213: Le Week-end à Roscoff, éditions des Montagnes Noires
2012: Nous avons la douleur de vous faire part, éditions des Montagnes Noires
2010: Quand il y a un mort à la fin, moi j'adore, Ed. Les Chemins Bleus
2009: La Place Bouchaballe, éditions Telen Arvor
2007: À l'abri de la tempête, éditions 
2005: Je ne suis pas un monstre, éditions La Part Commune
2003: Pendant l'agonie, la vente continue, éditions Telen Arvor
2002: Henri Thomas et la Bretagne, éditions Blanc Silex
2001: Une odeur d'amour, éditions Coop Breizh
1997: Le Grand Pays, éditions Telen Arvor
1994: Journal de Kermadeoua, éditions Liogan
1994: Deux années à digitales, éditions Blanc Silex
1987: Journal de ma boutique, éditions Telen Arvor

Bibliography 
1987: Gérard Le Gouic ou la Bretagne universelle, Jean Wagner, series "Visages de ce temps"
1977:Poésie présente : six poètes de Bretagne (Saint-Pol-Roux and Guy Faucher, Anne Teyssieras, Georges Drano, Gérard Le Gouic, Denis Rigal), Éd. Rougerie

External links 
 Gérard Le Gouic on Paléon éditions
 Comment allez-vous ? de Gérard Le Gouic on Recours au poème
 Gérard Le Gouic on Ricochet
 Poésie en Bretagne : Gérard Le Gouic on Poésie en Bretagne
 Gérard Le Gouic on Canopé
 Quotes  on Babelio
 Gérard Le Gouic on Le Printemps des poètes

20th-century French poets
21st-century French poets
21st-century French male writers
French male poets
1936 births
People from Finistère
Living people
20th-century French male writers